Ulric Guttinguer (31 January 1787, in Rouen – 21 September 1866, in Paris) was a French poet and novelist.

Works
Goffin, ou les Mineurs sauvés (1812)
Nadir, lettres orientales (1822)
Le Bal, poème moderne, suivi de poésies (1824)
Dithyrambe sur la mort de Lord Byron (1824)
Mélanges poétiques (1824)
Amour et opinion, histoire contemporaine (1827)
Charles Sept à Jumiège; Édith, ou le Champ d'Hastings, poèmes suivis de poésies (1827)
Arthur, Religion et Solitude (1836)

References
 France, Peter (Ed.) (1995). The New Oxford Companion to Literature in French. Oxford: Clarendon Press.  .

1780s births
1866 deaths
Writers from Rouen
Chevaliers of the Légion d'honneur
19th-century French novelists
French male novelists
19th-century French male writers
19th-century French poets